The Mr. Men Show is a remake of the British series, Mr. Men and Little Miss. It is virtually identical to the original British version, apart from the added live-action skits, actors and actresses, theme song, and credits. Its original airing was in Canada, and it aired in the United States started in the fall of 1997, being syndicated by The Summit Media Group.  In the Canadian/American version, there were live-action characters called "the Mr. Men Players", including the News Lady (with her sophisticated British accent), the Game Show Guy, a carpenter with his assistant, and a mad scientist with her assistant, among others.

The re-dubbed episodes of Mr. Men and Little Miss later appeared on their own on Cartoon Network's preschool-aimed program Small World, which showcased animation from around the world, albeit with the intro and end credits completely removed.

Episodes

Series overview

List of episodes

Season 1 (1997–99)

Cast

The Mr. Men Players 
 Catherine Fitch - Mad Scientist, Contestant, and Theatre Patron
 Peter Keleghan - Pal, Game Show Guy, and Frakenclown
 Marguerite Pigott - Newslady, Hostess, Actress, Strong Girl, and Theatre Patron
 Cliff Saunders - Buddy, Contestant, Caveman, Couch Potato, and Theatre Patron
 Sean Sullivan - Assistant Scientist, Guy in Theatre, and Director

Voices 
 Len Carlson - Mr. Tickle, Mr. Greedy, Mr. Sneeze, Mr. Messy, Mr. Uppity, Mr. Funny, Mr. Chatterbox, Mr. Fussy, Mr. Bounce, Mr. Strong, Mr. Grumpy, Mr. Quiet, Mr. Nonsense, Mr. Skinny, Mr. Clever, Mr. Slow, Mr. Perfect, Mr. Cheerful and Additional Voices
 Alyson Court - Little Miss Sunshine, Little Miss Trouble, Little Miss Giggles, Little Miss Magic, Little Miss Shy, Little Miss Chatterbox, Little Miss Late, Little Miss Busy, Little Miss Wise, Little Miss Tidy, Little Miss Fickle and Additional Voices
 Neil Crone - Mr. Bump, Mr. Messy, Mr. Topsy-Turvy, Mr. Silly, Mr. Small, Mr. Lazy, Mr. Impossible, Mr. Clumsy, Mr. Rush, Mr. Worry, Mr. Busy, Mr. Grumble and Additional Voices
 Catherine Disher - Mr. Muddle, Little Miss Naughty, Little Miss Neat, Little Miss Tiny, Little Miss Helpful, Little Miss Splendid, Little Miss Twins, Little Miss Lucky, Little Miss Scatterbrain, Little Miss Brainy, Little Miss Stubborn, Little Miss Curious, Little Miss Fun, Little Miss Somersault and Additional Voices
 Judy Marshak - Little Miss Bossy, Little Miss Dotty, Little Miss Star, Little Miss Greedy, Little Miss Contrary and Additional Voices
 Ron Rubin - Mr. Happy, Mr. Nosey, Mr. Daydream, Mr. Forgetful, Mr. Jelly, Mr. Noisy, Mr. Mean, Mr. Dizzy, Mr. Tall, Mr. Wrong, Mr. Mischief, Mr. Brave, The Narrator and Additional Voices

Notes

References 

Mr. Men series
1990s American animated television series
1990s American children's comedy television series
1997 American television series debuts
1999 American television series endings
1990s Canadian animated television series
1990s Canadian children's television series
1990s Canadian comedy television series
1997 Canadian television series debuts
1999 Canadian television series endings
American children's animated comedy television series
American television series with live action and animation
American television shows based on children's books
Canadian children's animated comedy television series
Canadian television series with live action and animation
Canadian television shows based on children's books
English-language television shows
Television series by 9 Story Media Group